Perry G. Mehrling (born August 14, 1959) is professor of economics at Pardee School of Global Studies at Boston University. He was professor of economics at Barnard College in New York City for 30 years. He specializes in the study of financial theory within the history of economics.

Life 
Perry Gandhi Mehrling received an A.B (magna cum laude), a Ph.D. from Harvard University and an M.Sc. from the London School of Economics. Mehrling was valedictorian of the class of 1977 at Boston Latin School. He was a professor in the Economics Department at Barnard College/Columbia University for 30 years until 2017 and is the Director of Educational Programs at the Institute for New Economic Thinking, a global not-for-profit organization dedicated to changing the way economics is currently taught. He teaches the hugely popular "Economics of Money and Banking" MOOC on the Coursera website.

Publications 
Mehrling is the author of The Money Interest and the Public Interest: American Monetary Thought, 1920-1970 as well as a recent biography of Fischer Black, Fischer Black and the Revolutionary Idea of Finance.
 The New Lombard Street. How the Fed Became a Dealer of Last Resort. Princeton University Press, Princeton, NJ 2011,  Linen: , e-book: 

He wrote his thesis under Meghnad Desai and Douglas Gale at the London School of Economics. It was published by the University of Chicago's Journal of Political Economy. It synthesized differential game-theoretic models of capitalism, due to Kelvin Lancaster and Richard M. Goodwin. Gale's general equilibrium handbooks on monetary economics acknowledge Merhling's assistance.

Money View 
Perry Mehrling's brainchild, the Money View, is a monetary-financial school of thought that links the (usually separate) intellectual realms of economics and finance. It offers an integrated approach for conceptualizing money, finance and (shadow) banking, which it sees as the fundamental infrastructure of capitalism. Other than most economic theories, it denotes analytical importance to the notion of liquidity as well as to the centrality of profit-seeking dealers as market makers.
The Money View has first been developed, formulated and put forward by Mehrling and is now - despite still being an academic minority view - popularized by scholars, central bankers and market practitioners around the world.

Description 
The speciality of the Money View is its ability to adequately synthesize current features of our integrated monetary and financial system, which Mehrling describes as 'money market funding of capital market lending', a.k.a. shadow banking, by paying attention to both the money market and the capital market.

The Money View includes elements of theories and insights by H.P. Minsky, Charles Kindleberger, Marcia Stigum, to name just a few.

Central institutions 
Money, as a means of payment, to facilitate (final) settlement. Credit, as a promise to pay (money). Finance, to facilitate valuation of promises to pay. Banking, as a means of allocation of credit.

Hierarchy of Money 
Inspired by Minsky's Hierarchy of Money, the Money View recognizes the de facto inequality of economic agents or entire countries in their capacity to issue something called money. A privileged few at the top of the hierarchy may issue money while the rest can only issue mere promises to pay money, i.e. credit (further down the hierarchy). The US dollar is at the top of the international hierarchy of money.

Politics 
The Money View is inherently political. Its political dimensions are manifold and include the following:

 a direct application of values the Enlightenment as a philosophical movement purports (by, inter alia, sustaining from vulgar assumptions on the nature of human beings that often prevails in economics, such as the homo economicus) 
ideas centered on reason as the primary source of knowledge 
 a recognition of the "difficulty of money"
 an open rejection of equilibrium accounts of the economy (and therefore of mainstream economic thought & teaching)
 a refutation of the quantity theory of money
 critical thinking about the monetary-financial system (as opposed to proficient manipulation of formal models)
 an emphasis on liquidity as compared to solvency

Epistemology 
The Money View relies on comparatively few assumptions and uses reason as the primary source of knowledge. Generally, its analytical framework is based on viewing every monetary entity in terms of their stylized balance sheet, which serves as basic tools for asset-liability management, i.e. to measure sources and uses of funding.

The Money View has been categorized by Zoltan Pozsar as 'monetary reality' (in contrast to monetary theory) because of its reliance on balance sheets and T-accounts.

References

External links 
 Perry Mehrling at Boston University Frederick S. Pardee School of Global Studies

1959 births
Living people
21st-century American economists
Barnard College faculty
Harvard University alumni
Institute for New Economic Thinking